Sverre Egil Oddanger (13 May 1928 – 17 November 2020) was a Norwegian football striker.

He played for Skeid between 1948 and 1955. Winning his sole cap for Norway in 1949, he became league champion in 1953 and 1954. Skeid has registered him with 178 games across all competitions.

Born Sverre Egil Olsen, he changed his last name to Oddanger in 1957. He died on 17 November 2020 in Tjøme.

References

1928 births
2020 deaths
Footballers from Oslo
Norwegian footballers
Skeid Fotball players
Norway international footballers
Association football forwards